What Hath God Wrought: The Transformation of America, 1815–1848 is a Pulitzer Prize–winning book written by historian Daniel Walker Howe. Published in 2007 as part of the Oxford History of the United States series, the book offers a synthesis history of the early-nineteenth-century United States in a braided narrative that interweaves accounts of national politics, new communication technologies, emergent religions, and mass reform movements. The winner of multiple book prizes, including the 2008 Pulitzer Prize for History, reviewers widely praised What Hath God Wrought. Historian Richard Carwardine said it "lays powerful claim to being the best work ever written on this period of the American past".

Background 
In the 1950s, historians C. Vann Woodward and Richard Hofstadter envisioned a multivolume history of the United States, modeled on the Oxford History of Europe. Hofstadter died before the series could launch as the Oxford History of the United States, which Woodward edited with Sheldon Meyer until 1999, when they passed on editorship to David M. Kennedy and Peter Ginna. During Woodward's editorship, historian Charles Grier Sellers was commissioned to write a volume covering 1815 to 1848. However, Woodward rejected Sellers's manuscript for the series, which journalists have attributed to Sellers's submission either being too focused on economics or too pessimistic about the United States during the era; Oxford University Press published Sellers's book separately in 1991 as The Market Revolution: Jacksonian America, 1815-1846. Daniel Walker Howe, at the time a professor of history at the University of California, Los Angeles and leading expert in the early-nineteenth-century United States, "was commissioned to write a do-over" for the period. His manuscript was under review at the press by the end of 2006.

Content and themes 
What Hath God Wrought: The Transformation of America, 1815–1848 tells a history of the United States from the Battle of New Orleans to the end of the Mexican–American War. Per its title, national transformation is the book's major through line, and Howe charts how during this period the United States politically integrated into a pluralistic, continental nation with mass political organizations, communication tools, and transportation technologies.

Politics 
More than half of the book's twenty chapters focus on political topics, and in the words of reviewer Jenny Wahl, the book "casts the first half of the nineteenth century as a struggle between Democrats and Whigs over the future of America". David Henkin describes the approach as remaining "attached to an older model of political history" that nevertheless achieves "admirable" versatility. In a retrospective about the book, Howe explained that he used politics as "the skeleton of the narrative", which he "flesh[ed] out with economic, social, and cultural history", because "politics is about power", and "Those who wield power often shape events."

In its political arc, What Hath God Wrought narrates the undoing of the Era of Good Feelings, the rise of the Democrat and Whig parties, and the clash between the two parties' competing visions for the future of the United States. Holding that democracy and capitalism were already more or less assured and accepted by voting Americans, Howe portrays a young nation in which the questions of the era revolved around rights and sociopolitical inclusion for women and people of color. Departing from long-popular interpretations of the era but building on a contemporaneous "rehabilitation of the Whigs" in American historiography, What Hath God Wrought casts the Whig party and its luminaries as its primary political protagonists. Howe even dedicates the book to the memory of John Quincy Adams, the "political nemesis" of Andrew Jackson, and Adams figures in the book as a champion of antislavery and women's rights. Rather than depict Whigs as stuffy representatives of gentility, Howe spotlights their advocacy of education and the arts, their support for internal economic development, their opposition to indigenous expulsion, and their participation in reform movements such as antislavery and women's rights.

Howe fastidiously abstains from the long-popular phrases "Age of Jackson" or "Jacksonian democracy" to describe the era on the grounds that rather than bring American people together, Andrew Jackson's presidency was divisive: as a person he was intemperate and authoritarian, and his (and his successor Martin Van Buren's) politics focused on entrenching white male power and excluding women, American Indians, and African Americans. While the Whigs had a proactive vision for the United States, Jacksonian Democrats were obstructionist, acting mostly to stop the Whig agenda, prevent government interference with state-driven expansions of slavery and violence against indigenous peoples, and enable local prejudice and persecution against minorities. In a roundtable forum about the book, James Huston said he had "not seen in print a more devastating portrait of Andrew Jackson as a brute, an authoritarian, and a law-breaker."

Economics 
Although Howe claims to "not argue a thesis" in the book, reviewers conclude that What Hath God Wrought implicitly (and sometimes explicitly) works to argue against the "market revolution" thesis promoted by Charles Sellers's 1991 book of the same title. Where Sellers had argued that the early-nineteenth-century United States economy painfully transitioned to market capitalism in a process that destroyed a humbler but happier way of life, Howe instead sees evidence for the growing market being a gradual development, congruent with market economies extant in the eighteenth-century United States. Moreover, economic development was a net positive for Americans' lives as markets became more accessible and luxuries became more affordable. Whiggish regulated capitalism was like a compost that "nourished democracy" by giving Americans more choices about how to behave, communicate, and participate in the world. In the growing economy, there were more diverse occupations, and the opportunities generated by commercialization produced a widespread optimism about human capacity and the national future.

Communication 
What Hath God Wrought characterizes 1815 to 1848 as a time in which a "communications revolution" was one of the most important driving forces shaping history and culture in the United States of that era. A growing print culture, proliferating newspapers, a robust postal service that could deliver by steamboat and train, and, eventually, the electromagnetic telegraph all extended the reach of information that organizations and individuals could propagate with increasingly less time lag. Technology enabled new ideas, whether religious or secular, to spread further than in previous generations, amplifying the voices of mass movements and expanding their audiences.

Religion and reform 
Four chapters scattered across the book foreground religious movements. What Hath God Wrought renders the Second Great Awakening as a mass phenomenon which Howe contextualizes within broader cultural, economic, and political conditions while simultaneously reading religious experience sensitively and avoiding reductive interpretations. Howe includes Quakerism, Unitarianism, and the Latter Day Saint movement in the Second Great Awakening alongside traditionally recognized Evangelical Protestant denominations, like Methodism. What Hath God Wrought portrays religion as a force in its own right, "a vibrant element of culture that shapes how people see the world", and the narration tends to be sympathetic toward religious people and their experiences.

Religious influence on reform movements is key to What Hath God Wrought's interpretation of the era. Howe grounds the Whigs' optimistic culture of self- and societal-improvement in postmillennial Christian thought and notes the overlap between the Second Great Awakening and the reform impulse. Whig politics and Protestant humanitarianism worked in tandem to promote social reform as postmillennialism galvanized prison reform, new charitable institutions, temperance, women's rights, abolition, and more. Although the period under study is bounded by the Battle of New Orleans and the Mexican–American War, the Seneca Falls Convention for women's rights is the book's true finale, serving as "the representative culmination of the period" and its reform movements.

Publication 
Oxford University Press released What Hath God Wrought: The Transformation of America, 1815–1848 in hardcover in 2007, selling it at a retail price of $35 (USD). Its dust jacket displayed imagery from a historical Whig political banner, depicting a bald eagle at the summit of a rocky outcropping dividing the image in two. Clipper ships and a steamboat sail in the background of the lefthand side; on the right, the banner portrays railroads, bridges, and a train, symbolizing the United States' optimistic culture of innovation at the time and the many technologically enabled transformations which took place. A paperback edition was released two years later, in Fall 2009.

Critical reception 

Reviewers widely praised What Hath God Wrought both ahead of and upon its release with several insisting that the book was a must-read for anyone interested in United States history. Multiple reviewers spoke of the book in superlative terms. Publishers Weekly called it "one of the most outstanding syntheses of U. S. history published this decade", and historian Richard Carwardine said What Hath God Wrought "lays powerful claim to being the best work ever written on this period of the American past". James Taylor Carson believed the book was especially successful given its genre, writing that "what makes What Hath God Wrought remarkable is that it successfully does what a great work of synthesis ought to do—it distills the broad sweep of multiple fields of inquiry into a comprehensible narrative of the past that speaks to our present-day concerns." A few reviewers highlighted What Hath God Wrought's apparent relevance to the present, as its emphasis on the communications revolution of the nineteenth century seemed to echo "the internet age of the 21st." Political parallels between Jackson's authoritarian jingoism and the then-contemporary Iraq War led one reviewer to surmise that "the story Howe tells of these years amounts to a thinly veiled critique of the present."

Reviewers occasionally criticized the book for fumbles. For example, historian Manisha Sinha wrote that What Hath God Wrought understates the Black church's distinctions from predominantly white mainline Protestantism. Mary Ryan lamented the book's portrayal of women as a mixed, "if not entirely pyrrhic, victory for the field of women's history" because women figured primarily in relation to male-dominated politics.

The book won several awards, and historian John Lauritz Larson joked that it "Collect[ed] prizes as numerous as Jupiter's moons". In 2007, What Hath God Wrought was a finalist for the National Book Critics Circle award in general nonfiction. By the end of 2008, the book received the Pulitzer Prize for History, the New-York Historical Society Book Prize, the silver medal for Nonfiction at the California Book Awards, and the Society for Historians of the Early American Republic's Best Book Award.

The book remains well regarded years later and is often called a "magisterial history" of the era. In 2014, historian Mark Noll named What Hath God Wrought as one of "his top 5 books for inspiring a passion for history".

See also 

History of the United States (1789–1849)
Timeline of United States history (1820–1859)

References

External links 

What Hath God Wrought on the Internet Archive

2007 non-fiction books
21st-century history books
English-language books
History books about the United States
Pulitzer Prize for History-winning works
Oxford University Press books